Jarala railway station (Urdu and ) is located in Jarala village, Jhang district of Punjab province, Pakistan.

See also
 List of railway stations in Pakistan
 Pakistan Railways

References

External links

Railway stations in Jhang District
Railway stations on Khanewal–Wazirabad Line